Orani is a municipality in the Philippines.

Orani may also refer to:
 Orani, Sardinia, a municipality in Italy
 , a village in Volodymyr-Volynskyi Raion, Volyn Oblast, Ukraine
 ORANI, an economics model by Peter Dixon

See also 
 Orani Church in Orani, Bataan
 , a region of western Algeria
 Orany (disambiguation)
 Arani (disambiguation)